Full Force (previously With Full Force) is a German heavy metal and hardcore punk-oriented music festival held annually since 1994.

Lineups

2010
2–4 July

Amorphis, As I Lay Dying, Bloodwork, Born from Pain, Burning Skies, Caliban, Callejon, Cannibal Corpse, Death Before Dishonor, Down by Law, Earth Crisis, Ektomorf, Elsterglanz, Evergreen Terrace, Fear Factory, Heaven Shall Burn, HORSE the Band, Killswitch Engage, Letzte Instanz, Maximum Penalty, Neaera, NOFX, Sick of It All, Slayer, Texas in July, The Bones, The Devil's Blood, The Exploited, Toxpack, Unleashed, Venom, Walls of Jericho

2009
3–5 July:
All Shall Perish, Amon Amarth, Anathema, Asphyx, August Burns Red, Backfire, Bloodclot, The Bouncing Souls, Bring Me the Horizon, Callejon, Carcass, Comeback Kid, Crushing Caspars, Deadlock, Der W, DevilDriver, Die Kassierer, Dimmu Borgir, Down, Eisregen, Emil Bulls, End of Green, Facebreaker, God Forbid, Gorgoroth, Hackneyed, Hatebreed, Helheim, Ignite, Legion of the Damned, Maroon, Mastodon, Motörhead, Mucky Pup, My Dying Bride, Narziss, Nervecell, No Turning Back, Parkway Drive, Raunchy, The Red Chord, Reno Divorce, Scarab, Sepultura, Smoke Blow, Social Distortion, The Sorrow, Soulfly, Stomper 98, Suicidal Tendencies, Terror,
Walls of Jericho, Warbringer

2008
4–6 July:

In Flames, Machine Head, Cavalera Conspiracy, Bullet for My Valentine, Ministry, Biohazard, Agnostic Front, Life of Agony, Avenged Sevenfold, 1349, A.O.K., Belphegor, Born from Pain, Broilers, Brutal Truth, Caliban, Cataract, Converge, Danko Jones, Death Before Dishonor, Death by Stereo, DevilDriver, Die Apokalyptischen Reiter, Discipline, Drone, Enemy of the Sun, Ensiferum, Entombed, Fall of Serenity, H2O, Hardcore Superstar, Heaven Shall Burn, Illdisposed, JBO, Japanische Kampfhörspiele, Job for a Cowboy, Krisiun, Lagwagon, Mad Sin, Madball, Mambo Kurt, Mayhem, Meshuggah, Misery Speaks, Moonspell, Morbid Angel, One Fine Day, Pöbel & Gesocks, Primordial, Psychopunch, Radio Dead Ones, Rotting Christ, Ryker's, She-Male Trouble, Six Feet Under, Slapshot, Subway to Sally, Tech 9, The Accidents, The Destiny Program, The Exploited, The Turbo A.C.'s, Volbeat, War from a Harlots Mouth

2007
29 June – 1 July:

Amon Amarth, As I Lay Dying, Barcode, Benediction, The Bones, Brujeria, The Business, By Night, Caliban, Cannibal Corpse, Children of Bodom, Chimaira, The Creetins, Die Kassierer, Dropkick Murphys, Earth Crisis, Enter Shikari, Ektomorf, Fear My Thoughts, Hatebreed, Ill Niño, Kampfar, Knorkator, KoRn, Lamb of God, Lousy, Manos, Maroon, Misconduct, Moonsorrow, Naglfar, Neaera, One Man Army and the Undead Quartet, Pain, Peter Pan Speedrock, Pro-Pain, Rotten Sound, Satyricon, Sick of It All, Slayer, Smoke Blow, Strung Out, Swallow the Sun, Sworn Enemy, Terror, Turisas, Unearth, Venerea, Volbeat, Walls of Jericho, Zuul FX

2005
1–3 July:

Crowbar, Mastodon, Obituary, Amen, Betzefer, Cataract, In Flames, Slayer, Spawn, Extreme Noise Terror, Killswitch Engage, Anti-Flag, Kataklysm, Sick of It All, Iron Maiden, Red Harvest, Raging Speedhorn, Anthrax, Nuclear Assault, Pro-Pain, The Hellacopters, Finntroll, Ektomorf, Beatsteaks, Dew-Scented, Die Apokalyptischen Reiter, Subway to Sally, Such a Surge

1999
Ministry, Monster Magnet, Manowar, Stormtroopers of Death, Sepultura, NOFX, 59 Times the Pain, Agnostic Front, Amorphis, Boiled Kilt, Children of Bodom, A.O.K., Beatsteaks, Bolt Thrower, Orgy, Die Schinder, Destruction, Discipline, Dritte Wahl, Enslaved, Grave Digger, Hypocrisy, Ignite, In Extremo, Immortal, Lagwagon, Mayhem, Metalium, Troopers, Mercyful Fate, Misfits, Moshquito, Oomph!, Painflow, Pitchshifter, Richthofen, H2O, Pro-Pain, Ryker's, Samael, Satyricon, Six Feet Under, Skyclad, Tanzwut, Theatre of Tragedy, Terrorgruppe, Temple of the Absurd, Totenmond

References

External links
Official website

Heavy metal festivals in Germany
Culture of Saxony
Recurring events established in 1994